The Studerhorn (3,634 m) is a mountain of the Bernese Alps, located on the border between the Swiss cantons of Bern and Valais. It lies between the Finsteraarhorn and the Oberaarhorn, on the ridge separating the basins of the Unteraar Glacier (north) and the Fiescher Glacier (south).

The mountain was named in honour of the Swiss geologist Gottlieb Samuel Studer.

See also
List of mountains of Switzerland named after people

References

External links
 Studerhorn on Hikr

Mountains of the Alps
Mountains of Switzerland
Mountains of Valais
Mountains of the canton of Bern
Alpine three-thousanders
Bern–Valais border